For other films, see Dost (disambiguation)

Dost (Devanagari: दोस्त; Nastaliq: دوست; translation: Friend) is a 1954 Hindi film produced by Kuldip Sehgal for Kuldip Pictures and directed by Rajendra Sharma. This film stars Suresh and Usha Kiran in lead roles with Om Prakash, Kammo, Khairati, Mohna, Majnu, Ramesh Thakur, Randhir, S. Kapoor, S. Nazir and Uma Dutt in support cast. The film song lyrics for this film were written by Verma Malik with Hansraj Behl composing the music.

Cast
Suresh
Usha Kiran
Om Prakash
Randhir

Crew
Director – Rajendra Sharma
Producer – Kuldip Sehgal
Production Company – Kuldeep Pictures
Music Director – Hansraj Behl
Lyricist – Verma Malik
Playback Singers – Madhubala Zaveri, Talat Mahmood

Soundtrack

References

External links

1954 films
1950s Hindi-language films
Films scored by Hansraj Behl
Indian black-and-white films